Aklan's at-large congressional district refers to the lone congressional district of the Philippines in the province of Aklan. It was represented by a single member in the House of Representatives of the Philippines who was elected provincewide at-large from 1957 until its reapportionment in 2018. The district was created following the establishment of Aklan as a regular province separate from Capiz on April 25, 1956 through Republic Act No. 1414. Before 1956, its territories were represented in the national legislatures as part of Capiz's at-large, 2nd and 3rd districts. It was a single-member district for the final four legislatures of the Third Philippine Republic from 1957 to 1972, the national parliament of the Fourth Philippine Republic from 1984 to 1986, and the 8th to 17th congresses of the Fifth Philippine Republic from 1987 to 2019.

After the 2018 reapportionment, all representatives have been elected from Aklan's 1st and 2nd districts. It was last represented by Carlito S. Marquez of the Nationalist People's Coalition (NPC).

Representation history

See also
Legislative districts of Aklan

References

Former congressional districts of the Philippines
Politics of Aklan
1956 establishments in the Philippines
2019 disestablishments in the Philippines
At-large congressional districts of the Philippines
Congressional districts of Western Visayas
Constituencies established in 1956
Constituencies disestablished in 2018